Nigel Philip Spink (born 8 August 1958) is an English football coach and former professional footballer.

He played as a goalkeeper from 1976 until 2001. He made his name at Aston Villa and also made one appearance for England at international level on the tour of Australia in 1983. He also played in the Football League for West Bromwich Albion and Millwall, and at non-league level for Chelmsford City and Forest Green Rovers, the latter he would go on to manage between 2000 and 2002. Spink later worked as a goalkeeping coach for Birmingham City, Wigan Athletic, Sunderland and Bristol City.

Playing career
Spink began his career with Writtle Minors F.C. at junior level before going as a school boy to West Ham United, but soon moved to Chelmsford City and then, at the age of just 18, to Aston Villa. It was almost five years before his big break in the first team came along, and it came on the biggest stage of all – the European Cup Final. Ten minutes into the 1982 final against Bayern Munich, Villa's first choice goalkeeper, Jimmy Rimmer, was injured and substitute keeper Spink was called into action, having only made one previous appearance in the first team. Spink performed superbly, keeping a clean sheet, and Villa won the game 1–0. By curious coincidence, Spink and Rimmer are two of the four England goalkeepers with the shortest international career (45 minutes).

He went on to make 460 appearances for Villa before moving to neighbouring club West Bromwich Albion in 1996, almost two decades after first joining Villa.

A £50,000 move in September 1997 took him down a division to Millwall in Division Two, and he continued playing at The Den for another three seasons until he finally retired in June 2000, just before his 42nd birthday.

Coaching career
After retiring as a player, Spink had a two-year spell as manager of Forest Green Rovers in the Conference National. He led Forest Green to the 2001 FA Trophy final but they lost 1–0 against Canvey Island at Villa Park. He was eventually sacked in September 2002.

He then worked under Steve Bruce at Birmingham City, Wigan Athletic and Sunderland as a goalkeeping coach. He left Sunderland on 6 December 2011, following Bruce's dismissal a few days earlier. Spink was goalkeeping coach at Bristol City from February 2012

Personal life
After the end of the 2012–13 season, Spink left the game and started his own courier business.

Honours
Aston Villa
Football League Cup: 1993–94
European Cup: 1981–82
European Super Cup: 1982

Individual
PFA Team of the Year: 1987–88 Second Division

References

External links

1958 births
Living people
Sportspeople from Chelmsford
Aston Villa F.C. players
West Bromwich Albion F.C. players
Millwall F.C. players
Forest Green Rovers F.C. players
Forest Green Rovers F.C. managers
Association football goalkeepers
English footballers
English football managers
England international footballers
England B international footballers
Premier League players
Birmingham City F.C. non-playing staff
Wigan Athletic F.C. non-playing staff
Bristol City F.C. non-playing staff
Swindon Town F.C. non-playing staff
Sunderland A.F.C. non-playing staff
Chelmsford City F.C. players
Association football goalkeeping coaches